Agnes of Brandenburg (born 17 July 1584 in Berlin; died 26 March 1629 in Amt Neuhaus) was a Princess of Brandenburg by birth and by marriage successively Duchess of Pomerania and of Saxe-Lauenburg.

Life 
Agnes, a member of the house of Hohenzollern, was a daughter of the Elector John George of Brandenburg (1525–1598) from his third marriage with Elisabeth of Anhalt-Zerbst (1563–1607), daughter of Prince Joachim Ernest of Anhalt.

On 25 June 1604 in Berlin, she married her first husband, Duke Philip Julius of Pomerania-Wolgast (1584–1625).  The pair resided at Wolgast Castle.  A folwark at Udars on the island of Rügen was named after her: Agnisenhof.  In 1615, Elisabeth was involved, at the request of her husband, in the financing of a mint in Franzburg.  After Philip Julius's death, Agnes lived on her wittum, the district of Barth.  Dubslaff Christoph von Eickstedt auf Rothenklempenow, who had been adviser to her husband, served as her privy counsellor and captain.

Elisabeth was married again on 9 September 1628, at Schloss Barth, to the ten years younger Duke Francis Charles of Saxe-Lauenburg (1594–1660), who was a general in the imperial army.  With this second marriage, she lost her rights to Barth. However, Francis Charles persuaded Wallenstein to force Duke Bogislaw XIV to allow her to keep Barth until her death.

Both of her marriages were childless.

Footnotes

References 
 Samuel Buchholtz: Versuch einer Geschichte der Churmark Brandenburg, 1767, p. 490, Online

External links 

 http://www.ruegenwalde.com/greifen/phijul/phijul.htm

Duchesses of Saxe-Lauenburg
House of Hohenzollern
17th-century German people
1584 births
1629 deaths
Pomeranian nobility
People from Berlin
Daughters of monarchs
Remarried royal consorts